The Chasa Bonpuri, known in other versions as the Chesa Bonpuri (1933 version) or the Cheseo Bonpuri (2006 and 2008 versions), is a Korean myth of Jeju Island. It is a myth that tells how Gangnim, the death god, came to be. As one of the best-known myths in the Korean peninsula, the Chasa Bonpuri is a characteristic hero epic.

Etymology 
The term Chasa Bonpuri (차사 본풀이) means "Solving the origins of the death god"; modern academic circles synonymize "Bonpuli" with "myth". Chasa is the Standard Korean pronunciation of the Chinese word Chaishi (差使), meaning "messenger". In the Jeju language however, chaishi is pronounced Chesɒ or Cheshi, leading to the different names per each version.

Collections 
The Chasa Bonpuli has been directly collected from shamans nine times; below is a chart of these collections.

Major plot 
Like all oral myths, there are multiple versions of the Chasa Bonpuli. The best-known version, introduced in the Encyclopedia of Korean culture, is related here.

King Beomu, who ruled the kingdom of Donggyeong, had seven sons, four of whom were blessed with long life, while three were not. When the three sons were nine, the monk of Donggwaneumjeol died, saying to his student; "The lifespans of the three sons of King Beomu are fifteen years. Lengthen their lives by making them monks."

After three years of mourning, the student took the three sons of King Beomu and made them monks. After the princes had been monks for three years, they returned home. Their mentor gave the advice to evade the realm of Gwayang, then sent them away with linen and silk.

The princes, however, were famished, and entered the house of Gwayangsaeng, who lived in the realm of Gwayang. The wife of Gwayangsaeng (whose name is not given) gave the princes intoxicating wine, then poured molten oil into their ears. The wife then took the linen and silk and sank the cadavers in the Jucheon River. 
Seven days later, Gwayangsaeng's wife discovered three lotus blossoms floating on the Jucheon River. The wife took the flowers to her home. However, the flowers moved, attacking her whenever she approached them. Gwayangsaeng's wife finally threw them in the fireplace, where they morphed into three orbs. Gwayangsaeng's wife accidentally swallowed the orbs. Soon, she grew pregnant, and delivered three triplets.

The triplets were very talented, and when they were fifteen, they were the first, second, and third best in the Gwageo examination. In celebration of their talents, they held a Munjeonje, a ritual to Munsin, the door god. As they bowed before the door, they all fell dead.

Gwayangsaeng's wife constantly plagued the King of Gwayang, Gimchi Wonnim, to go to the Underworld and bring back Yeomra, the god of the dead, so that she may know the cause of their death. Gimchi Wonnim was forced to send one of his generals, Gangnim, to the Underworld. Gangnim had eighteen concubines, but one wife. Gimchi Wonnim asked all his ministers to meet him at dawn. However, Gangnim was drunk from a birthday party for his eighteenth mother-in-law (the mother of his eighteenth concubine), and was late to Gimchi Wonnim's summonings. Using this crime, Gimchi Wonnim sent Gangnim to capture Yeomra.

Gangnim asked his concubines for help, but to no avail. However, his official wife gave him a siru-tteok after sacrificing two other siru-tteok to Jowangsin, the hearth goddess, and Munsin. His wife also gave him a green robe with a needle pierced on it and red paper with white writing. Then, Gangnim went on his way.

First, Gangnim found an old woman. When he ran to meet her, the old woman vanished, only to appear again a few miles west. He finally caught her under a willow tree, where she was eating a siru-tteok]. Gangnim found that the old woman's siru-tteok was the same as his own. The woman revealed herself to be Jowangsin, and told Gangnim the directions to the Underworld.

Gangnim followed the directions into a place where the road branched in seventy-seven different ways. There was already an old man there. As the old man ate his siru-tteok, Gangnim discovered that it was again same as his own tteok. The man was Munsin, the door god. Munshin told him the names of all seventy-seven trails. They included 'the trail that was made when the sky and earth were one', 'the trail that was made when the sky and earth were parted', 'the trail that was made in the creation of man', 'the trail that the Cheonjiwang of the Sky uses', 'the trail that the Cheonjiwang of the Earth uses', 'the trail that the Chenjiwang of man uses', 'the mountain trail', 'the money trail', 'the trail of the officials', 'the trail of the kings', 'the trail of the nation', 'the trail of the dead', 'the trail of the Sansin king', 'the trail of the Sansin officials', and 'the trail of the five dragons'. Finally, Munsin pointed out the seventy-seventh trail; 'the trail of Gangnim the Mortal'. Gangnim headed on that trail.

Gangnim then reached a lake; the Henggimot Lake. The Henggimot was surrounded by spirits who had not been able to enter the Underworld. These spirits had starved for eras, and attacked Gangnim. Gangnim distracted them with his last remaining tteok, then threw himself into the Henggimot.

When he came out of the lake, he found himself standing before the Yeonchu Gate, the gate to the Underworld. When Yeomra emerged in a procession to a divine feast held by the god Wonbokjangi, Gangnim emerged and blocked the procession. With a single strike, he slew all of Yeomra's thirty thousand soldiers. With another strike, he slew Yeomra's sixty thousand servants. Gangnim then enroped Yeomra with a steel chain.

Yeomra invited Gangnim to Wonbokjangi's feast. Wonbokjangi offered wine to all of the one hundred gods, but not to Gangnim, the hundred-and-first god. The infuriated Gangnim killed Wonbokjangi's wife. When Wonbokjangi offered Gangnim wine as well, Wonbokjangi's wife was breathing again.

Meanwhile, Yeomra had vanished. Gangnim sought Yeomra, but could not find him. Suddenly, a goddess standing near the hearth muttered that Gangnim was a fool, for he could not know that there was a pillar through the table. There indeed was a pillar that went through the table. When Gangnim prepared to chop the pillar down, the pillar transformed into Yeomra, who promised that he would go to Gwayang. Gangnim told Yeomra to write it down on words. Yeomra thus tattooed his vow on Gangnim's back, writing it down in the script of the Underworld.

Gangnim asked Yeomra the way back to Gwayang. Yeomra told Gangnim to follow a pure white hound. The hound guided him to a light in the darkness. The light was his own house, where his wife was holding a jesa, a mourning ritual, for him. He asked his wife behind the locked gate; "Why are you mourning for me? I have been gone for only three days." His wife answered; "How can my husband be truly back? You have been gone for three years. Give me your robe, so that I may know it is you, and not Mr. Kim next door." Gangnim then understood that a day in the Underworld was a year in the mortal world. Gangnim's wife checked the needle on her husband's robe, and let him in.

Meanwhile, Mr. Kim (Kim Seobang), who wanted the hand of Gangnim's wife in marriage, was glancing above the walls when he discovered Gangnim. Urgently, he ran and told Kimchi Wonnim, the king of Gwayang, that Gangnim was secretly living in his wife's house. The enraged Kimchi Wonnim ordered soldiers to imprison Gangnim.

In afternoon, Yeomra descended in the land of Gwayang. Yeomra ordered Gimchi Wonnim to bring out Gwayangsaeng and his wife. Yeomra told the Gwayangsaeng couples to dig up the place where they had buried their triplets. However, the grave had three empty coffins, and no body. When they searched the Jucheon River, the triplets' bones were there. Yeomra tapped their body, and the three sons of King Beomu returned to life. Only now did the Gwayangsaeng couples understand that their triplets were the princes, reborn, that they had murdered eighteen years before. Yeomra turned the Gwayangsaeng couple into mosquitoes, and returned the princes into Donggyeong.

Yeomra asked Gimchi Wonnim to give him Gangnim. Gimchi Wonnim refused. Yeomra then offered Gimchi Wonnim a choice between Gangnim's soul and the body. Gimchi Wonnim chose the body, and Gangnim's body instantly collapsed. Yeomra made Gangnim the Jeoseung Chasa, who reaps the souls of the dead.

Meanwhile, the Encyclopedia of Korean Folk Religions version is this.

King Beomeul of Dongjeong had nine sons. The eldest three and the youngest three died, and only the middle three survived. One day, a passing monk named Muya (who also appears in several other myths) said that the three sons would survive only if they became merchants for six years. The princes headed to the Kingdom of Junyeon. There, they met the wife of Gwayangsaengi, Gwayanggaxi, who gave them poisoned wine. Gwayangsaengi's wife sank the bodies in the Kkachi Well.

The next day, a clump of berries had grown below the Kkachi Well. Gwayanggaxi ate them and grew pregnant. She gave birth to three triplets, who were extremely intelligent; they swept the Gwageo examination. As they knelt to their parents after the Gwageo, they all fell dead.

Gwayanggaxi asked the governing official of her village, which was called Gimchi, to find out the cause of the mysterious deaths. When the official of Gimchi refused, she spread false rumours about the official around the village. The angered official sent his lieutenant, Gangnim, to the Underworld to capture Yeomra and bring him to the mortal world.

When Gangnim's mother heard the news, she gave her son six siru-tteok, advised him to honor all old people he may meet on the way, then sent him on his way. He first discovered an old woman, who was faster than even Gangnim. When Gangnim finally caught her and gave her a siru-tteok, she revealed her identity as Jowangsin, then told him to follow a road to the west.

Gangnim continued until the road forked into ninety-nine trails. There, three immortals were playing a game of Baduk. Gangnim gave each immortal a siru-tteok, and they advised him to wait until a vividly clothed man came this way.

Meanwhile, the immortals had vanished. Gangnim discovered that a fierce man with vivid clothes who was holding a red paper in his hands was coming this way. He was Haewonmaek, the original reaper of souls.

When Haewonmaek sighted the siru-tteok, he voraciously devoured it. He then saw Gangnim, and said; "I am in debt to you. What do you want?" Gangnim answered that he wished to know the trail to the Underworld. Haewonmaek showed Gangnim the trail that Yeomra used.

Gangnim followed the trail until he reached a vast river. It was the Henggi river, which formed the border of the Underworld. Many of the dead, who could not pay the ferryman, strolled around aimlessly around the river. (these are called Gaekgwi, meaning Wondering Ghosts) Gangnim gave up his last siru-tteok to pay the ferryman to take him and all the Gaekgwi across the Henggi river.

Gangnim had finally reached the Underworld, but did not know where Yeomra was. He finally fell asleep until he was awakened by a booming noise; the march of Yeomra and his soldiers to the Siwang Maji ritual, held in the realm of the mortals. Gangnim slew the soldiers of Yeomra, and destroyed Yeomra's chariot. The frightened Yeomra asked Gangnim if he would go to the Siwang Maji ritual with him. Gangnim accepted.

Amidst the Siwang Maji ritual, Yeomra had escaped. Gangnim turned into a falcon and surveyed the region, only to find an owl on a wooden ritualistic pole. Gangnim, as a falcon, voraciously attacked the owl. The owl turned into Yeomra, who promised he would go to Gimchi on afternoon. He then grabbed Gangnim's throat and threw him back to Gimchi. Gangnim's throat bulged because of Yeomra, which is why men have Adam's apples.

Gangnim returned to his mother's house in Gimchi, and waited until Yeomra descended. Yeomra entered with a thundering shake, and ripped Gwayangsaengi's wife into pieces. He threw her soul into a realm of serpents. He then drained the waters of the Kkachi Well, and made the three princes of King Beomul the Siwang, three of the ten judges of the Underworld. (The other seven are the three sons of Princess Bari, the three Chogong brothers, and Yeomra himself)

Yeomra asked the official of Gimchi if he wanted Gangnim's body or the soul. At the time, the people were unaware that the soul existed, and as a result, the official chose the body. Gangnim's body then crumpled, and Gangnim became the new Jeoseung Chasa, replacing Haewonmaek.

Minor plot 
Two other stories concerning Gangnim after he became a god also appears in the Chasa Bonpuli.

 Gangnim had the mission to capture Samani, who had bribed Haewonmaek to live for 40,000 years. (See Menggam bon-puri myth) Gangnim knelt down and began to wash charcoal on a river. When people asked him why he was doing that, Gangnim answered that it was because the charcoal would turn white if he washed it for a hundred years. One day, an old man laughed at Gangnim's explanation and said; "I have lived for 40,000 years, yet I have never heard such a thing." Gangnim then caught Samani and brought him to the Underworld, where he, too, became a god.
 Gangnim had to reap the dead when a man was 70 years old, and when a woman was 80 years old. One day, Gangnim asked a crow to reap the souls for him. The crow took the book that had the lifespans of the dead. When the crow saw a dead horse lying on the road, it dropped the book to eat the horse meat. A rat snake crawled out and ate the book. From then on, the snake had the privilege of dying eight times, and yet being reborn eight times. When the crow noticed the book was gone, it blamed a hawk on a nearby tree. The hawk and crow fought viciously, and still do to this day. The crow finally cried out; "Parents, die when your children do. Children, die when your parents do. Men, die when your wives do. Women, die when your husbands do." When Gangnim discovered that the crow had lost the book, he crushed its legs, which is why crows have bent legs.

Ritual uses 
All Bonpuli myths are part of larger rituals. The Chasa Bonpuli is a part of the Siwangmaji ritual, which is itself a part of the Keungut ceremony. The Siwangmaji is a ritual that honors all death gods, and the Chasa Bonpuli seeks to appease Gangnim so that he may lengthen a person's given life, and also that he may offer kindness to those that he reaps. The recital of the Chasa Bonpuli is in the form of an epic song, and the shaman (Simbang), wearing the robe of farmers, recites the epic along the rhythm of a drum-like instrument called Janggu. The Chasa Bonpuli appears in all major reports of the Keungut ceremony, and is also recited in the Gwiyang Puli, a mourning ritual.

Gangnim in other rites 
Gangnim appears in the Menggam Bonpuli, where he captures Samani (see above) He also appears in the Hwangcheon Honshi myth, where there are four reaping gods; "Gangnim the Child" (Gangnim Doryeong), "Gangnim the Reaper" (Gangnim Chasa), "Death Reaper"(Jeoseung Chasa), and "Mortal Reaper" (Iseung Chasa).

In Jeju Island, Gangnim is said to first earn permission from the village god for him to reap the dead. He then reads the name of the reaped thrice from a book with red paper and white ink, and guides the dead to the Underworld.

Gangnim also appears in many folk songs. Below is an excerpt of the Mozzineun Norae song;

"Jeoseung Chaesa Gangrim Doryeong Iseung Chaesa Yi Myengseoni Hutcheogaso Hutcheogaso Yi Motjari Hutcheogaso" (Death Reaper Gangrim Doryeong, Mortal Reaper Yi Myeongseoni, take this take this take this paddy)

This song was sung when replanting rice shoots in the ground. This song admits 'Gangrim Doryeong' and 'Yi Myeongseoni' as two reaper gods. (Other Iseung Chasa are 'Yi Deokchun' and Yi Sammani'. The latter is said to protect from snake bites.)

Features 
Not like any other narrative, Chasa Bonpuri mentions a variety of references to the origins of the rite. In the Chasa Bonpuri, Gangnim who goes the underworld is particularly important, and through his journey, it depicts the paths of the underworld that existed only in imagination. Chasa Bonpuri is explaining why human death has become disorder in relation to the origin of death, and focusing the role of the authority or ability of the reapers, such as Gangnim.

Comparisons with other myths 
The Chasa Bonpuli bears the most similarity to the Jimgajegut myth, recited in the northernmost Hamgyeong Province. In the Jimgajegut myth, a man named Son goes to the Underworld to find the reasons for the mysterious death of the three triplets of Jimgaje. Although they are from the respective north and south of the country, the Jimgajegut's plot is almost identical to the Chasa Bonpuli.

References

Further reading 
 Hangyeore Old Stories, Shin Dongheun and Jeong Chulheon, 1999
 Capture Yeomra Daewang, Jeong Haseob, 1999
 With God-Mythology, Ju Homin, 2012

Korean shamanic narratives